Matthew Joseph Bruccoli (August 21, 1931 – June 4, 2008) was an American professor of English at the University of South Carolina. He was the preeminent expert on F. Scott Fitzgerald. He also wrote about other writers, notably Ernest Hemingway, Thomas Wolfe and John O'Hara, and was editor of the Dictionary of Literary Biography.

Early life
Matthew Joseph Bruccoli was born in 1931 in The Bronx, New York to Joseph Bruccoli and Mary Gervasi. He graduated from the Bronx High School of Science in 1949. He studied at Cornell University, where one of his professors was the noted author Vladimir Nabokov, and at Yale University.  On campus, he was a founding member of the fledgling Manuscript Society, graduating in 1953. In 1960, he received a PhD in English literature studies from the University of Virginia, where he was supervised by Fredson Bowers.

Bruccoli's interest in F. Scott Fitzgerald began in 1947 when he heard a radio broadcast of Fitzgerald's short story "The Diamond as Big as the Ritz". That week he tracked down a copy of The Great Gatsby, "and I have been reading it ever since," he told interviewers.

Career
Bruccoli taught at the University of Virginia and the Ohio State University early in his career. He settled at the University of South Carolina, where he earned tenure and taught for four decades. He lived in Columbia, South Carolina, where, according to his New York Times obituary, he "cut a dash on campus, instantly recognizable by his vintage red Mercedes convertible, Brooks Brothers suits, Groucho mustache and bristling crew cut that dated to his Yale days. His untamed Bronx accent also set him apart."

Over the course of his career, Bruccoli wrote more than 50 critical books on F. Scott Fitzgerald and other literary figures. His 1981 biography of Fitzgerald, Some Sort of Epic Grandeur: The Life of F. Scott Fitzgerald, is considered the standard Fitzgerald biography. He has edited many of Fitzgerald's works, from This Side of Paradise to Fitzgerald's unfinished final novel, The Last Tycoon. It had first been published posthumously in 1941. Edited by Bruccoli, it was published in a new version in 1993 as The Love of the Last Tycoon, part of a collection by Cambridge University Press. Bruccoli also edited Zelda Fitzgerald's only novel Save Me the Waltz; she was married to Scott.

While studying Fitzgerald, Bruccoli and his wife Arlyn began to collect all manner of Fitzgerald memorabilia. Bruccoli owned the artist's copy of Celestial Eyes, the cover art by Francis Cugat which appeared on the cover of the first edition, and most modern editions, of The Great Gatsby. In 1969, Bruccoli befriended Frances "Scottie" Fitzgerald, the daughter of the Fitzgeralds. In 1976, Bruccoli and Scottie Fitzgerald Smith published The Romantic Egoists, from the scrapbooks that F. Scott and Zelda had maintained. These had included numerous photographs and book reviews. Later in life Bruccoli and his wife donated their collection to the Thomas Cooper Library at University of South Carolina. The collection is valued at nearly $2 million.

Bruccoli was general editor of the "Pittsburgh Series in Bibliography," published by the University of Pittsburgh Press. As part of this series, he produced F. Scott Fitzgerald: A Descriptive Bibliography and, with Richard Layman, Ring W. Lardner: A Descriptive Bibliography (1976). Bruccoli had written a working draft of the Lardner book in the summer of 1973 before giving it to" his then-graduate-research-assistant Layman to work on checking it. Layman displayed so much aptitude for the assignment that a collaboration seemed obligatory."  In 1983, Bruccoli published Ross Macdonald / Kenneth Millar: A Descriptive Bibliography in the "Pittsburgh Series in Bibliography."

Along with Layman, who became recognized as a Dashiell Hammett scholar, and businessman C. E. Frazer Clark, Jr., Bruccoli launched the Dictionary of Literary Biography. The 400-volume reference work contains biographies of more than 12,000 literary figures from antiquity to modern times.

Private life
Bruccoli married Arlyn Firkins on October 5, 1957. They had four children: Mary, Joseph, Josephine Owens, and Arlyn Bruccoli.

Death
Bruccoli continued working at the University of South Carolina until being diagnosed with a brain tumor. He died on June 4, 2008.

References

External links
 Matthew J. Bruccoli papers at the University of South Carolina Irvin Department of Rare Books and Special Collections.
Bio at USC

1931 births
2008 deaths
University of South Carolina faculty
Writers from South Carolina
Yale University alumni
University of Virginia alumni
Ohio State University faculty
American academics of English literature
The Bronx High School of Science alumni
University of Virginia faculty
American male non-fiction writers
20th-century American male writers